Wilhelm Benque (1843-1903) was a French portrait photographer of German origin, belonging to an important dynasty of photographers, the Benques.

Biography

Wilhelm Benque, known as "the Younger", descended from a family from Ludwigslust (Mecklenburg, Germany). His uncle, the landscape painter Wilhelm Friedrich Alexander Benque (1814-1895), had a younger brother, Christian Benque (1811-1883) whose son, Franz Benque (1841-1921) became a photographer, first in Hamburg (1869-1870), then in Brazil (from 1878) before finally settling in Trieste. From the 1880s onwards, the Benques represented a dynasty of photographers, with a presence on three continents. When Wilhelm Benque arrived in Paris, he was associated with one of the members of the Benque family, Franz Wilhelm Benque (1857-1912), son of the landscape photographer Wilhelm Benque.

In the 1880s and 1890s, the Benques established their studio in Paris at 33, rue Boissy-d'Anglas under the name Benque, Benque et Cie. A successful venture, the they occupied a private mansion at this address, targeted a luxury clientele, and even opened an exhibition store at 5 rue Royale.

In the meantime, the company joined forces with two other photographers, named Klary (?-?) and Kneubuhler (1816-1880), and the name became Benque & Klary for a time until it was taken over by Matuszewski after 1902.

The Benques also opened a second studio in Nice around 1883-1884.

Benque was particularly active with personalities linked to the world of opera and the Parisian stage. They took well-known photographs of Louise Abbéma, Valentin Duc, Eleonora Duse and Cléopâtre-Diane de Mérode when she was promoted to "grand sujet" among the ballerinas in 1896.

The Benque studios enjoyed an international reputation by the end of the 19th century.

References 

1843 births
1903 deaths
19th-century French photographers